On 17 October 2006 at 9:37am local time (07:37 UTC), one Rome Metro train ploughed into another train as it unloaded passengers at the Vittorio Emanuele underground station in the city centre, killing a 30-year-old Italian woman, named Alessandra Lisi, and injuring about 145 others, of which a dozen were reported to be in life-threatening conditions.

The whole Line A was immediately shut down and the area above the station, the Piazza Vittorio Emanuele II, was cordoned off by police as rescue workers erected a field hospital, where dozens of people were treated. The injured were gradually transported to various Rome hospitals for further treatment, with the Complesso Ospedaliero San Giovanni - Addolorata, being the nearest, receiving most of them.

While no official cause of the accident has been released, officials have excluded terrorism as a cause for the incident. Several passengers have reported that the driver of the moving train failed to stop at a red signal and that the train had been running strangely at previous stations. A senior driver has disclosed that the moving train had previously had braking problems on a test drive.

A possible explanation of the accident may lie in a misunderstanding between the driver and the control centre, which would have authorized the train to proceed to the "next station", meaning a station closed to the public (Manzoni), the last before Vittorio Emanuele station, while the driver would have understood it to mean the next working station, that is, Vittorio Emanuele itself.

See also
2006 in rail transport

References

External links
The Independent
Sydney Morning Herald
BBC News
 RAI News
BBC News

Rome Metro
Rome
Rome metro crash
2000s in Rome
October 2006 events in Europe
Train collisions in Italy
2006 disasters in Italy